Jeremy "Jerry" Rice (born 3 October 1990) is a British skeleton racer. He competed in the 2018 Winter Olympics.

References

1990 births
Living people
Skeleton racers at the 2018 Winter Olympics
British male skeleton racers
Olympic skeleton racers of Great Britain
Team Bath winter athletes